Moffit or Moffitt may refer to:

Geography
 Moffit, North Dakota
Mount Moffit, Alaska

People
 Athol Moffitt (1914–2007), an eminent Australian jurist
 Bill Moffit (1926–2008), American composer  
 Billie Jean Moffitt, birth name of American tennis player, Billie Jean King
 Brett Moffitt, American stock car driver
 Donald Moffitt, science fiction writer
 Donald L. Moffitt, a Republican member of the Illinois House of Representatives
 Ernest Moffitt (1871–1899), an Australian artist
 H. Lee Moffitt, cancer survivor who founded the H. Lee Moffitt Cancer Center & Research Institute
 Hosea Moffitt (1757–1825), a U.S. Representative from New York
 Howard Moffitt, builder
 Jefferson Moffitt (1887–1954), an American screenwriter and film director
 John Moffitt (American football) (born 1986), retired offensive lineman
 John Moffitt (athlete) (born 1980), an American track and field athlete
 John H. Moffitt (1843–1926), a U.S. Representative from New York
 Ken Moffitt (1933–2016), English footballer
 Peggy Moffitt (born 1939), a fashion model 
 Ralph Moffitt (1932–2003), English golfer
 Randy Moffitt (born 1948), a former American baseball pitcher
 Robert Moffit, Director of the Center for Health Policy Studies at The Heritage Foundation
 Ronni Moffitt (1951–1976), an American political activist
 Rowan Moffitt, an Australian admiral
 Terrie Moffitt, (born 1955), an American clinical psychologist
 Thad Moffitt, American racing driver
 William Moffitt (1925–1958), British quantum chemist

Organizations
 H. Lee Moffitt Cancer Center & Research Institute, University of South Florida, Tampa 
 Moffitt Library, University of California, Berkeley
 Moffitt Royal Commission, a royal commission to investigate the extent and activities of organised crime in the state of New South Wales, Australia

Other uses
 Moffitt architecture, the eccentric vernacular architectural style of Howard Moffitt

See also
 Moffat (disambiguation)
 Moffatt (disambiguation)
 Moffett (disambiguation)